Sachin is a 2019 Indian Malayalam-language film directed by Santhosh Nair and written by S. L. Puram Jayasurya. It stars Dhyan Sreenivasan, Aju Varghese, Hareesh Kanaran, Renji Panicker, Ramesh Pisharody, Appani Sarath, Maniyanpilla Raju, Anna Rajan, Maala Parvati, Aabid Nassar, Reshmi Boban and Sethu Lakshmi. Sachin is a romance film in the backdrop of cricket. The story revolves around a boy who born on the auspicious day when cricketer Sachin Tendulkar hit century. After watching Sachin's performance, Viswanathan (Raju) got excited and named his son as Sachin. The film was released on 19 July 2019.

Premise
Sachin is born on an auspicious day when the nation celebrated Sachin Tendulkar. Excited after watching Sachin's performance, Viswanathan promptly named his new born son "Sachin". Sachin too played cricket while growing up and his love for Sachin Tendulkar was unflinching. Meanwhile, Sachin falls in love with Anjali, a village damsel who is four years elder to him. (it can be recalled that Anjali, wife of Sachin Tendulkar too is elder than him) Later on, trouble brew in and their wedding get cancelled. how Sachin resolve the issues forms the rest of the story.

Cast

 Dhyan Sreenivasan as Sachin Vishawanath
 Aju Varghese as Kokachi Jerry/Jerry Thomas
 Anna Rajan as Anjali Ramachandran 
 Hareesh Kanaran as Poocha Shyju
 Appani Sarath as Kudiyan Jose
 Ramesh Pisarody as Shine Ramachandran 
 Renji Panicker as Ramachandran
 Maniyanpilla Raju as Viswanathan
 Juby Ninan as Naveen
 Sethu Lakshmi as	Sarojam
 Reshmi Boban as Radhamani
 Maala Parvati as Devika
 Firoz Azeez as Cricket match commander
 Aabid Nassar as Sali
 Kochu Preman
 Balaji Sarma
 Manoj
 Elisabeth
 Arun Raj 
 Yadhu Krishna
 Valsala Menon
 Lija

Production
Sachin is directed by Santhosh Nair, written by S. L. Puram Jayasurya and produced by Jude Agnel Sudhir and Juby Ninan under the banner JJ Productions. Cinematographer is Neil D'Cunha, editor is Ranjan Abhraham. Sachin is Santhosh Nair's second film after Money Ratnam.

The pooja function took place at Beaumond Hotel in Kochi. Renji Panicker made the switch-on and Alwin Antony made the first clap. The main shooting location of the film are Punlaur, Pathnapuram, Thenmala.

Soundtrack
Music is composed by Shaan Rahman for the lyrics of Manu Manjith.

References

External links
 

2019 films
2010s Malayalam-language films
2019 comedy-drama films
Indian comedy-drama films
Films about educators
Films set in universities and colleges
Films shot in Thiruvananthapuram
Films scored by Shaan Rahman
Films shot in Alappuzha
Films shot in Kollam
Films about filmmaking
Sachin Tendulkar